The Light of the Desert is the world’s largest faceted cerussite gem, weighing . It is currently part of the collection of the Royal Ontario Museum (ROM) in Toronto.

The raw cerussite was discovered in Tsumeb in northern Namibia. It was then acquired by a gem cutter from Arizona, who cut the raw material into the gem on display.  Cerussite is extremely fragile and sensitive to temperature changes and vibration; cutting and transport of the gem therefore causes significant problems.  After it was cut in Arizona, the gem was placed in a box, then wrapped in a large woolen scarf and a winter vest, and then hand transported to Toronto for display. Cerussite is too fragile to be set in jewelry.

References

Collections of the Royal Ontario Museum
Individual gemstones